Parkvale is a suburb of Hastings City, in the Hawke's Bay Region of New Zealand's North Island.

Children in the settlement began being educated in hop-drying kiln building in 1919. It remained a separate settlement from Hastings until the second half of the 20th century.

Splash Planet is a water park in the suburb.

Demographics

Queens Square had a population of 4,128 at the 2018 New Zealand census, an increase of 246 people (6.3%) since the 2013 census, and an increase of 459 people (12.5%) since the 2006 census. There were 1,734 households, comprising 1,947 males and 2,178 females, giving a sex ratio of 0.89 males per female, with 741 people (18.0%) aged under 15 years, 741 (18.0%) aged 15 to 29, 1,689 (40.9%) aged 30 to 64, and 951 (23.0%) aged 65 or older.

Ethnicities were 79.9% European/Pākehā, 18.8% Māori, 5.4% Pacific peoples, 9.4% Asian, and 1.1% other ethnicities. People may identify with more than one ethnicity.

The percentage of people born overseas was 20.1, compared with 27.1% nationally.

Although some people chose not to answer the census's question about religious affiliation, 46.1% had no religion, 38.9% were Christian, 1.4% had Māori religious beliefs, 1.2% were Hindu, 0.8% were Muslim, 0.7% were Buddhist and 4.2% had other religions.

Of those at least 15 years old, 489 (14.4%) people had a bachelor's or higher degree, and 777 (22.9%) people had no formal qualifications. 306 people (9.0%) earned over $70,000 compared to 17.2% nationally. The employment status of those at least 15 was that 1,569 (46.3%) people were employed full-time, 471 (13.9%) were part-time, and 117 (3.5%) were unemployed.

Education

References

Suburbs of Hastings, New Zealand